Neoregelia olens is a species of flowering plant in the genus Neoregelia. This species is native to Brazil.

Cultivars

 Neoregelia 'Andromeda'
 Neoregelia 'Angie'
 Neoregelia 'Big O'
 Neoregelia 'Blood Plum'
 Neoregelia 'Bob and Barb'
 Neoregelia 'Bright Spot'
 Neoregelia 'Cardinal'
 Neoregelia 'Cheers'
 Neoregelia 'Chilli Pepper'
 Neoregelia 'Christopher Robin'
 Neoregelia 'Cocktail'
 Neoregelia 'Cocktail Girls'
 Neoregelia 'Cocktail Heat'
 Neoregelia 'Coral Fire'
 Neoregelia 'Fiona'
 Neoregelia 'Flaming Lovely'
 Neoregelia 'Flicker'
 Neoregelia 'Gillian'
 Neoregelia 'Golden Jewels'
 Neoregelia 'Golden Ruby'
 Neoregelia 'Golden Sapphire'
 Neoregelia 'Good Morning'
 Neoregelia 'Heart's Blood'
 Neoregelia 'Heck'
 Neoregelia 'Kiko'
 Neoregelia 'Li Hing'
 Neoregelia 'Marie'
 Neoregelia 'Olly Wilson'
 Neoregelia 'Phoebe'
 Neoregelia 'Piglet'
 Neoregelia 'Pinol'
 Neoregelia 'Queen Of Spots'
 Neoregelia 'Red Face'
 Neoregelia 'Salute'
 Neoregelia 'Sparky'
 Neoregelia 'Squirt'
 Neoregelia 'Stormy Forest'
 Neoregelia 'Stormy Forest Too'
 Neoregelia 'Stout Fellow'
 Neoregelia 'Sweet Cocktail'
 Neoregelia 'Topaz'
 Neoregelia 'Truly'
 Neoregelia 'Vulcan'
 Neoregelia 'Winnie the Pooh'
 Neoregelia 'Xmas Cheer'
 Neoregelia 'Zico'

References

BSI Cultivar Registry Retrieved 11 October 2009

olens
Flora of Brazil